Lake Omapere Road Crossing railway station was a station on the Okaihau Branch in New Zealand.

It was opened on 1 May 1914 and closed on 27 January 1974.

References

Defunct railway stations in New Zealand
Rail transport in the Northland Region
Railway stations opened in 1914
Railway stations closed in 1974
Buildings and structures in the Northland Region